"Juicebox" is a song by American rock band the Strokes. It was written by singer Julian Casablancas and produced by David Kahne. The song was released by RCA Records as the lead single from the Strokes' third studio album, First Impressions of Earth (2005). In the United States, the song was released in October 2005, while in the United Kingdom and Australia, it was released in December. Casablancas was quoted in Spin as saying this about the song: "I remember people saying this track's ugly, I think it's got a great personality." The track was leaked long before its scheduled single release, forcing the band and managers to release it as a single in iTunes format earlier than planned. The B-side to the single is the song "Hawaii".

Reception
Their first single in over a year, "Juicebox" marked the Strokes' second single to reach the Top 10 in the UK and also their highest charting single to date. The song also became their first and only single to chart the US Billboard Hot 100, at number 98.

Music video
The video for "Juicebox", directed by Michael Palmieri with cinematography by Christopher Doyle, features comedian David Cross as a DJ in a radio station in New York City. The video caused some controversy because it contained graphic sexual content,  which caused Palmieri to heavily edit it so it would be less explicit.

Track listings

Charts

Release history

References

External links
 
 

The Strokes songs
2005 singles
2005 songs
Bertelsmann Music Group singles
Music videos credited to Alan Smithee
Obscenity controversies in music
RCA Records singles
Rough Trade Records singles
Song recordings produced by David Kahne
Songs with music by Henry Mancini
Songs written by Julian Casablancas
UK Independent Singles Chart number-one singles